Air Vice Marshal Clifford Mackay McEwen CB, MC, DFC & Bar (2 July 1896 – 6 August 1967) was a fighter ace in the British Royal Flying Corps during World War I and a senior commander in the Royal Canadian Air Force during World War II. His Second World War service culminated in his commanding No. 6 Group RCAF in England from 28 February 1944 to 13 July 1945.

During his command the performance of the RCAF was greatly improved, becoming the most successful Allied bombing force in several ways. By late 1944 the RCAF had both the best survival rate and the highest accuracy of any bombing force. 

McEwen was born on 2 July 1896 in Griswold, Manitoba and grew up in Moose Jaw, Saskatchewan.

References
Notes

Bibliography
 
 Encyclopaedia of Saskatchewan – McEwen, Clifford Mackay
 Clifford MacKay McEwen
 Canada's 25 Most Renowned Military Leaders

|-

|-

Royal Canadian Air Force officers
Royal Flying Corps officers
Royal Canadian Air Force air marshals of World War II
1896 births
1967 deaths
Canadian recipients of the Military Cross
People from Westman Region, Manitoba
Recipients of the Distinguished Flying Cross (United Kingdom)
Recipients of the Bronze Medal of Military Valor
Canadian military personnel from Manitoba
Canadian military personnel of World War I